The Bryant Knob Formation is a geologic formation in Missouri. It preserves fossils dating back to the Silurian period.

See also

 List of fossiliferous stratigraphic units in Missouri
 Paleontology in Missouri

References

 

Geologic formations of Missouri
Silurian System of North America
Silurian southern paleotropical deposits